Niten Chandra is an IAS officer and one of the important office holder in Government of India who is currently serving as Law Secretary of India.

References 

Indian Administrative Service officers
Living people
Year of birth missing (living people)